The W213 Mercedes-Benz E-Class is the fifth-generation of the Mercedes-Benz E-Class. Sold from 2016 (as a 2017 model), it is the successor to the W212/S212 E-Class models. The coupe/convertible models share the same platform as the sedan/wagon, in contrast to the previous generation. The high-performance Mercedes-AMG E 63 and E 63 S versions of the W213 have been available as well from 2016 (as a 2017 model), and these are the only versions with V8 engines.

Since the mid 1990s, the Mercedes-Benz E-Class has been equipped with quad headlights and a differentiated design compared to the C-Class and S-Class. With the 2017 model, Mercedes decided to take a more streamlined direction, first seen with the 2014 E-Class mid-generational refresh and then going in an entirely new direction with the all-new 2017 model.

Launched in spring 2016 following a world debut at the 2016 North American International Auto Show in January, the 2017 E-Class was the most technologically advanced car Mercedes had ever produced at the time. This current generation of the Mercedes E-Class has won many plaudits from automotive publications, including the 2021 Motor Trend Car of the Year, the first time Mercedes-Benz has ever won this award.

Development and launch 
The whole development process stretched over 48 months. In that time, Mercedes-Benz produced 1,200 prototypes and drove a combined 12 million kilometres in some of the world's toughest conditions, from sub-zero temperatures in the snow through to the world's hottest deserts. In testing the car, Mercedes-Benz also had its prototypes conduct over 10,000 autonomous braking procedures and 5,000 automated lane changes as part of the Distronic suite of semi-autonomous driving features. Moreover, it took 1,200 engineers to make the fifth-generation E-Class.

After Mercedes-Benz invested close to €1 Billion into the development of the extensive refresh to the 2014 mid-life facelift of W212 E-Class, the W213 E-Class was unveiled at the 2016 North American International Auto Show. The 2017 E-Class has a design similar to that of the larger W222 S-Class and the smaller W205 C-Class. While its predecessor had a tighter surface and harder edges, the 2017 model is curvier and more flowing. An official design sketch was released in late December 2015, which confirmed that the new E-Class mirrors the styling of the C-Class and S-Class. Official photos of the 2017 E-Class were leaked on the internet on 4 January 2016 ahead of its unveiling.

The W213 was first released in the saloon configuration, which went on sale in the summer 2016. The Estate, offering a similar 695-litre luggage capacity to its predecessor, went to sale towards the end of 2016. A two-door Coupe arrived in 2017, before the Convertible completes the line-up towards the end of 2017. The W213 E-class was deemed one of Car and Driver's "10 Best vehicles" in 2019.

Design 

Stylistically, the 2017 E-Class followed the latest C-Class, the GLA, and the S-Class coupé. Its front end features Mercedes’ familiar bullet-shaped headlights and an upright grille, while its rear end gets a pair of LED taillights, with similarities to the 2014 E-Class models, that extend into the quarter panels. As on other recent models, the 2017 E-Class features two distinct front-end treatments: a traditional chrome grille and a more sporting blade grille. The aerodynamic efficiency have been refined as the drag coefficient improved from 0.25 in the previous model to a class-leading 0.23.

W212 facelift comparison 

The W213 adopts Mercedes’ modular MRA platform, as used by the contemporary C-Class and S-Class models. It is 2 mm narrower and 6 mm lower than its predecessor. The increased use of high-strength steel and aluminium is claimed to make the car up to 100 kg lighter than the W212 E-Class.

The W213 E-Class is based on the F800 Style design language, previously used on the larger W222 S-Class (2013) and the smaller W205 C-Class (2014). However, the facelifted W212 (2013) also incorporates several design cues from the F800 Style, thus the two vehicles share several design traits.

The W213 E-Class' front bumper is reminiscent of the facelifted W212's optional sport kit (dubbed the AMG Sports Package), as it is governed by two air intakes united by a mesh grille. Compared to the standard front bumper of the W212, which is similar to the one used on the W205 C-Class, the W213 E-Class' proposal is more aggressive, composed and simple. The classic iconic grille, has simpler, flowing lines, with a more imposing presence on W213, while the sport variant (with the big logo in the middle) isn't so different from the W212. The S-Class inspired, sweptback (first time in Mercedes executive-class history) and rather compact headlights are the styling feature of the W213 model.

On both cars the doors sit pretty high, squeezing the windows, but the W212 masks this "trait" with a subtle slope towards the headlights. In fact, on the profile of the facelifted W212, it still retains the edgy lines that came out in 2009. At the back, the W213 adopted a fresh design for the lights similar to the S-Class. However, the tailpipes finishers are similar to the ones found on the W212, with the rear bumper keeping its overall shape.

Interior 

The interior of the 2017 E-Class was unveiled by Mercedes-Benz in December 2015, which was previewed on the Concept IAA (Intelligent Aerodynamic Automobile) that Mercedes showed in September 2015 at the Frankfurt Auto show. The interior mounts two 12.3-inch full HD screens housed within a single unit. Most E-Class models receives the widescreen set-up as standard. However, base Avantgarde versions features traditional analogue dials with a seven-inch multi-information display, along with an 8.4-inch central infotainment screen. Mercedes-Benz claimed a first for the automotive industry, adding a pair of touch-sensitive control buttons on the steering wheel, which respond to finger swipes to control the car's infotainment system. The more traditional Command controller is also retained on the centre console.

Equipment

Autonomous driving 
A number of sensors, cameras and radars has allowed semi-automated driving. There may be fewer sensors and cameras than before (12 and four respectively over the W212 model), but they all feature increased functionality which reduces cost and complexity.

The system is not a hands free operation and an audible alert will prompt the driver into regaining control if the car detects their attention has wandered.

The car is able to scan the surrounding area, as well as the car in front, if road markings are unclear to maintain lane discipline. The system is also able to automatically increase or decrease the E-Class's speed by reading speed limit signs if the driver fails to take any action.

Safety innovations 
Active Brake Assist and Evasive Steering Assist work in tandem to warn of and prevent potential collisions in the 2017 E-Class. The first system now features increased functionality, able to provide visible warning of potential danger as well as being able to automatically apply the brakes in an emergency. The system is now also able to detect and analyze moving traffic at junctions ahead. Evasive Steering Assist can detect when a driver is making an evasive action and apply additional steering force to ensure the pedestrian or vehicle is avoided. Car-to-X Communication is another safety system which enables vehicles on the same road to warn each other of upcoming potential hazards or accidents.

If an unavoidable side collision is detected, PRE-SAFE Impulse Side rapidly inflates the side bolster to move the occupant away from the point of impact, while at the same time PRE-SAFE Sound pumps noise waves through the speakers to reduce hearing damage following a collision.

Adaptive LED Matrix Lighting 

Introduced on the CLS for 2014, Mercedes’ Multibeam LED headlamps are enhanced for the 2017 E-class. The individual LED count increases from 24 to 84, each individually controllable—switching between high- and low-beams, and the curve-following adaptive-lighting functions are now achieved entirely via electronics. The light pattern is also altered in city driving or via information from the navigation system.

As with the mid-cycle refresh of W212, the 2017 E-Class features two larger units instead of the four-eyes headlights, though LED light bars within the headlamps still gives the night-time effect of four individual units.

Drift mode 
This allows the driver to engage in easier drifts.

Variants

Estate/All-Terrain 

In a departure from previous generations, the Estate is offered in two distinct variants: a traditional on-road model and an All-Terrain version to directly rival the Audi A6 Allroad and Volvo V90 Cross Country.

Unveiled at the 2016 Paris Motor Show, the Estate All-Terrain features a 29 mm higher ride height due to the Air Body Control air suspension (15 mm) and 20 in wheels fitted as standard (14 mm). There is also external plastic cladding to protect the body from scratches and scrapes, as well as the 4Matic permanent four-wheel-drive system with 31/69 front-rear torque split.

E 300 (2016-2023) 
An E 300, with a 2.0-litre turbo petrol engine, will join the range at launch. This engine was previously available in the facelift W212 E-class in some markets.

E 350 (2019-2023) 
The E 350, with an updated 2.0-litre turbo petrol engine, will join the E-Class range for the 2020 model year. This engine is also used in the facelift W205 C-Class and X253/C253 GLC-Class, as well as the W167 GLE-Class. Selected markets such as Malaysia and Australia have the EQ Boost feature available on this engine, which produces an additional . It has a  acceleration time of 5.9 seconds.

E 400 (2016-2019) 
An E 400 with a 3.0-litre twin-turbo M276 V6 petrol engine. It accelerates from 0– in 4.9 seconds, a full second faster than the E 350.

E 400 Wagon (2016-2019) 

An E 400 with the same 3.0-litre M276 biturbo V6 petrol engine as the sedan version. This car share many similarities with the E 400 sedan but shows differences in its styling and engine. The main difference seen in this particular model is the fact that it has an increased cargo area. The E 400 wagon has a maximum space of 64.3 cubic feet of load space compared to with 57.4 in the sedan version. The E 400 wagon can also be equipped through options with third row seating allowing more passengers to ride in the car.

E 450 (2019-) 
For the 2019 model year, the E 400 was renamed to E 450.
For the 2020 facelift, the M276 Biturbo V6 was dropped for the new M256 3.0L Inline 6 turbo with EQ Boost.

E 350e Plug-in Hybrid (2016-) 

The E 350e is a plug-in hybrid, equipped with a  turbocharged inline-four coupled with an  electric motor between the engine. The E 350e's transmission is a nine-speed automatic gearbox. Mercedes claims that the car has a  electric only range. The hybrid plug to charge the car is connected on rear bumper through a small door similar to how the gas door is set up. The way to distinguish an E 350e from a non-hybrid E 300 is the badging. An E 350e badge is placed on the rear trunk as well as a blue "Plug-in Hybrid" on the side of the car. Mercedes offers an option to paint the brake calipers the same blue as the "Plug-in Hybrid" as well.

Long wheelbase (V213; China)

The V213 is the latest generation long wheelbase E-Class saloon. This Long-Wheelbase version so far is only available in the Chinese and Indian Markets. The E-Class V213 was launched at the 2016 Beijing Auto Show and went on sale in China in August the same year. The V213 E-Class is often referred to as the ‘smaller S-Class’, mainly due to the many similarities they have including the shape of the c-pillar and so on.

The car is 5,065 mm long, which makes it the longest E-Class ever made. The V213 E-Class is sold in three basic models, E200L, E300L and E320L, all of which can be selected between Exclusive line and AMG Line designs. The new 4-cylinder turbocharged M274 or M276 petrol engines are available, which are quick enough to get the E200L from 0- in 8.6s, E300L in 6.9s and E320L 4MATIC in a claimed 5.7s. This time the all new 9G-Tronic Transmission which focuses more on efficiency and smoother gear changes is standard across the whole range.

On 29 September 2020, Mercedes also unveiled the facelifted version of V213 LWB E-Class at the Auto China 2020. Like before, this is only sold in China and India.

Since its launch, there have been some disappointment as well as admiration in China. The longer wheelbase and luxury equipment have made the new E-Class popularly recognized as the less expensive alternative to the S-Class. Another reason being that the design has taken inspiration from the Maybach S-Class. While some buyers are dissatisfied with the fact that some of the equipment like the multibeam headlights and several driving assistances, which are brand new features on this model, do not come as standard and are listed as "optional extras" (to pay for), others comment that the spacious cabin, new interior (all V213 E-Class have 12.3 inch displays) and luxurious features such as onboard Wi-Fi and wireless charging, and automatic emergency brakes as standard, which are items not available on the worldwide W213 E-Class contribute to the Long-Wheelbase's market success. The price difference between W213 and V213 E-Class in China is not significantly large, around only 10,000 RMB ($1,560), which makes the V213 E-Class even more attractive to buy.

Drivetrain (2016–2020) 
Engine options for the 2017 E-Class saw a major update, thanks to the switch to inline-6 engines from the current V6 engines, along a new generation of four-cylinder diesel engines (OM654) and existing four-cylinder petrol engines (M274). All engines, save for the AMG V8, come standard with Mercedes’ 9G-TRONIC nine-speed automatic gearbox; the AMG V8 uses a 9-speed AMG SPEEDSHIFT gearbox.

Until April 2018, the E 200 was available with a 6-speed manual transmission in Europe, but it was discontinued and 9G-Tronic became standard. Alongside standard rear-wheel drive, select engines are offered with optional four-wheel drive. In 2017, Mercedes-Benz launched the E 180 model utilizing the M274 DE16 LA engine in select markets, such as Egypt, Tunisia, Turkey, the Philippines and Singapore.

Engines (2016-2020) 

* - Only available in selected markets, including but not limited to - Turkey, Egypt, Philippines, Singapore and Vietnam.

Transmissions (2016-2020)

Mercedes-AMG models

AMG E 43 (2016–2018) 

The all-wheel-drive only Mercedes-AMG E 43 joined the range in September 2016, powered by a  3.0-litre Biturbo V6, producing  of torque, mated to a nine-speed automatic transmission. Acceleration from 0 to  takes 4.6 seconds. The AMG E 43 was the first of the new AMG 43 series with a higher output of 401 PS vs 367 PS of the existing AMG 43 series. The E 43 was dropped for the 2018 model year, replaced by the E 53. Since the discontinuation of the E 43 in 2018, an E 400 (now renamed to E 450) was launched to fill the gap between the 4-cylinder E300 and the 6 cylinder, high-performance AMG E 53.

AMG E 53 4MATIC+ (2018–2023) 

Due to the higher volume of mid-level AMG version, this type of engine is tuned by AMG and built on the assembly lines by people and robots at the manufacturing plants rather than "one man, one engine" approach. The Mercedes-AMG coupé and cabriolet versions were introduced once again after skipping C207/A207 (2010–2017). AMG E 53 4MATIC+ remains the sole AMG version for both coupé and cabriolet.

AMG E 63 4MATIC+ and AMG E 63 S 4MATIC+ Saloon/Sedan (2016–2023)

Presented in November 2016, the new Mercedes-AMG AMG E 63 4MATIC+ and AMG E 63 S 4MATIC+ received AMG M177 twin-turbo 4.0-litre V8 in two states of tune and with fully variable all-wheel-drive. While most other high-performance AMG variants such as the E53 have had electrification added in recent years, the E63 stands out as one which didn't receive such a performance-enhancing 48V mild-hybrid system. Director of Vehicle Development at Mercedes-AMG, Drummond Jacoy, gave two main reasons, physical space and market positioning. "We want a Race Start [launch control feature], we want quick shifting," Jacoy said. "To do that we've used our electromechanical clutch and not a torque converter," the latter of which works with the integrated starter-generator (ISG) setup found in the EQ-Boost mild-hybrid tech. "To be completely honest with you, we have package restraints, so we couldn't fit the ISG in there." Secondly, "We have a car lineup," Jacoy noted, "and above the E63 we have the GT63 S, so we don't want to have an overlap there. We kept more power exclusive to the GT63 S."

AMG E 63 4MATIC+ and AMG E 63 S 4MATIC+ Estate/Wagon (2016–2023) 
Just like the AMG sedan versions, the E 63 wagon is also equipped with 4MATIC+ fully variable AWD and is also equipped with the M177 biturbo 4.0 litre V8 in two states of tune. The AMG E 63 wagon's styling cues and features are much different from the base model to distinguish that it is a performance variant of the car. The front bumper is wider, a front splitter is added, and large opening flanks are seen on the AMG-branded grille. The car also has various AMG branding throughout it to show its significance and the badging on the rear trunk lid depicts that it is in fact an AMG E 63 (S) wagon. The AMG E 63 wagon is equipped with 64 cubic feet of cargo volume compared to the AMG E 63 sedan's 57.4 cubic feet. The vehicle is also used as the official F1 medical car. As with the sedan, the wagon also does not receive the mild-hybrid technology found in other cars in the AMG lineup.

W213 Facelift 

For the 2021 model year, the E-Class has received updated front and rear fascias along with a new mild-hybrid 6-cylinder inline engine for the E450 model; the All-Terrain model will now be available in the United States, replacing the standard estate version. It was supposed to be released at the 2020 Geneva Motor Show, which was cancelled due to COVID-19. Inside, COMAND is replaced by MBUX with a 12.3-inch touchscreen and a new steering wheel is used. Driver-assistance technology has also been updated featuring an advanced capacitive hands-off detection system.

Mercedes-AMG announced on 27 May 2020 that the updated Mercedes-AMG versions of coupé and cabriolet are now available. The E 53 4MATIC+ version remains the sole choice for both coupé and cabriolet.

In mid-2022, Mercedes-AMG revealed the Final Edition version of the E 63 S 4Matic+. Signifying the V8s swan song in production, a total of 999 units will be built.

Engines (2020-2023)

References

External links 
E class Sedan official site (USA)
E class Wagon official site (USA)
E class sedan official site (UK)
E class wagon official site (UK)
New Mercedes-AMG E53 4Matic+ Cabriolet First Look -2023 (India)

E-Class
Executive cars
Sedans
Station wagons
Cars introduced in 2016
W213
All-wheel-drive vehicles
Rear-wheel-drive vehicles
Full-size vehicles
Plug-in hybrid vehicles
Limousines
2020s cars